The Tedeschi Trucks Band is an American blues and blues rock group based in Jacksonville, Florida. Formed in 2010, the band is led by married couple Susan Tedeschi and Derek Trucks. Their debut album, Revelator (2011), won the 2012 Grammy Award for Best Blues Album. The band has released five studio and three live albums.

History
After touring together in 2007 as the Derek Trucks & Susan Tedeschi's Soul Stew Revival, the couple merged their respective groups to form the Tedeschi Trucks Band in 2010. Their first concert was on April 1, 2010, at the Savannah Music Festival.

The first Tedeschi Trucks Band album, Revelator, was released on June 7, 2011.  The album peaked at No. 92 on the Canadian Albums Chart, No. 164 in the UK Albums Chart and won a Grammy Award for Best Blues Album.

Their second album, Everybody's Talkin', was recorded live and released in May 2012.

In 2013, the band was nominated for the Blues Music Awards and released their third album, Made Up Mind.

The band gave a Joe Cocker Mad Dogs and Englishmen tribute concert at the 2015 Lockn' Festival featuring alumni musicians from that album including Leon Russell, Claudia Lennear and Dave Mason.

The band's first three albums were published by Sony Masterworks, but their 2016 album, Let Me Get By, was released on Fantasy Records. Produced by Trucks, the album debuted at number 15 on the Billboard 200 album sales chart. In 2017, Tedeschi Trucks Band released a full-length concert film and album recorded in Oakland, CA, Live from the Fox Oakland.

The fourth studio album, Signs, was released on February 15, 2019, on Fantasy Records and Concord. On January 9, 2019, the band announced tour dates through August 2019. Signs was chosen as a 'Favorite Blues Album' by AllMusic.

Layla Revisited (Live at LOCKN') was announced on May 7, 2021. The album is a one-time live recording of the Derek and the Dominos album Layla and Other Assorted Love Songs performed in full with Trey Anastasio. Recorded on August 24, 2019 at the LOCKN' Festival in Arrington, VA, the album was released on July 16, 2021.

On April 20, 2022, Tedeschi Trucks Band announced I Am the Moon, a quadruple album featuring 24 original songs which was released in four parts throughout the year, beginning with I. Crescent on June 3, II. Ascension on July 1, III. The Fall on July 29 and IV. Farewell on August 26. The album was also released as a box containing all four parts on September 9.

Band members
 Susan Tedeschi – lead vocals, rhythm and lead guitar (2010–present)
 Derek Trucks – slide and lead guitar (2010–present)
 Tyler Greenwell – drums, percussion (2010–present)
 Mike Mattison – harmony vocals, acoustic guitar (2010–present)
 Mark Rivers – harmony vocals (2010–present)
 Kebbi Williams – saxophone (2010–present)
 Ephraim Owens – trumpet (2015–present)
 Elizabeth Lea – trombone (2015–present)
 Alecia Chakour – harmony vocals (2015–present)
 Brandon Boone – bass guitar (2019-present)
 Gabe Dixon – keyboards, vocals (2019-present)
 Isaac Eady – drums, percussion (2021-present)

Former band members
 Oteil Burbridge – bass guitar (2010-2012)
 Tim Lefebvre – bass guitar (2013–2018)
 Maurice "Mobetta" Brown – trumpet (2010–2015)
 Saunders Sermons – trombone (2010-2015)
 Kofi Burbridge – keyboards, flute (2010–2019; his death)
 J.J. Johnson – drums, percussion (2010–2020)

Touring musicians
 Dave Monsey – bass (2012)
 Ted Pecchio – bass (2012)
 George Porter, Jr. – bass (2012)
 Eric Krasno – bass (2013)
 Bakithi Kumalo – bass (2013)
 Carey Frank – keyboards (2017)

Timeline

Discography

Studio albums

Live albums

Archival releases

EPs

Charted singles

Awards and nominations

Notes

References

External links

 "Derek Trucks & Susan Tedeschi Band NYE Review", JamBase article.
 "Tedeschi Trucks Band Bring It Home", Rolling Stone article. 
Herbie Hancock, 'Space Captain,' Feat. Susan Tedeschi and Derek Trucks Spinner magazine article.

2010 establishments in Florida
American blues musical groups
American blues rock musical groups
American world music groups
Grammy Award winners
Jam bands
Musical groups established in 2010
Southern rock musical groups from Jacksonville